Mohammad Hardi Jaafar (born 30 May 1979) is a Malaysian footballer who is a midfielder. Hardi Jaafar is known for his shooting techniques, contributing many long shot goals and being a set piece taker. He is a former member of the Malaysia national football team.

Career
He was the captain of the Melaka Telekom team prior to their withdrawal from the Malaysia Super League competition. He then agreed to join his home team, Perak FA, for the 2007/08 season. He helped Perak to reach the quarterfinal of the 2008 AFC Cup.

With Malaysia, Hardi was given his first ever international caps against New Zealand on 19 February 2006. His impressive playing style and creative performances led to him being one of the three senior players chosen by Norizan Bakar for the 2006 Doha Asian Games.

Hardi made his first appearance in the Asian Games by scoring a goal against the Oman under-23. He then scored a goal against China under-23 in the second match. However Malaysia finished bottom of the group after losing all three matches, 1–3 against Oman under-23, 1–3 against China under-23, and 0–4 to eventual silver medalist Iraq under-23.

After the Asian Games, Hardi was selected for the 2007 ASEAN Football Championship. He started in all of the matches in the tournament. He made his first international goal in the semifinal against Singapore. However Malaysia eventually lost to Singapore in the penalty shootout after drawing the second game in Singapore.

He also was chosen to be on the national team for the 2007 AFC Asian Cup, where he played in all of Malaysia's matches. In this tournament, Malaysia were beaten by China in the opening game 1–5, won 5–0 against Uzbekistan, then lost to quarterfinalist Iran 0–2.

At the 2008 Merdeka Tournament, Hardi helped Malaysia reach the final but his team lost against Vietnam.

Hardi also represented the Malaysia XI (Malaysia Selection) squad against Chelsea F.C. at Shah Alam Stadium on 29 July 2008. The Malaysia XI eventually lost 0–2. However, Chelsea manager Luiz Felipe Scolari praised the Malaysia XI for giving a good fight against his team.

For the 2009 Malaysia League, Hardi left Perak FA and returned to his former team, Selangor FA. He made his second debut with Selangor in the match against Kedah, which Selangor won 4–1.

He spent the 2012 season playing for Felda United FC. In 2013, he did not play for any club due to injury. He made a comeback in 2014 to join his former club Perak FA.

International goals

Honours
TM FC
 Malaysia Super League: Runners-up 2005-06

Selangor
 Malaysia Super League: 2009, 2010
 Malaysia FA Cup: 2009
 Malaysia Charity Shield: 2009

References

External links
 2007 ASEAN Football Championship
 Player profile – doha-2006.com
 
 

1979 births
Living people
Malaysian people of Malay descent
Malaysian footballers
Malaysia international footballers
2007 AFC Asian Cup players
People from Ipoh
People from Perak
Perak F.C. players
Selangor FA players
Felda United F.C. players
Malaysia Super League players
Association football defenders
Footballers at the 2006 Asian Games
Asian Games competitors for Malaysia